David Lincoln Rabinowitz (born 1960) is an American astronomer, discoverer of minor planets and researcher at Yale University.

Career 
David Rabinowitz has built CCD cameras and software for the detection of near-Earth and Kuiper belt objects, and his research has helped reduce the assumed number of near-Earth asteroids larger than 1 km by half, from 1,000–2,000 to 500–1,000. He has also assisted in the detection of distant solar system objects, supernovae, and quasars, thereby helping to understand the origin and evolution of the Solar System and the dark energy driving the accelerated expansion of the universe.

Together with Tom Gehrels of the University of Arizona and his Spacewatch team, Rabinowitz discovered or co-discovered other astronomical objects including 5145 Pholus – a Centaur, credited by the MPC to Spacewatch– and the unnumbered Apollo near-Earth object 1991 BA, which remains uncredited.

Awards and honors 

The minor planet 5040 Rabinowitz, a Phocaea asteroid discovered by Tom Gehrels at Palomar Observatory in 1972, was named in his honor and for his work at Spacewatch.

List of discovered minor planets 

David Rabinowitz is credited by the Minor Planet Center with the discovery and co-discovery of 34 minor planets during 1989–2010.

1992AD is with a comet-like orbit of 92.26 years without a tail, which orbits between Saturn and Neptune. It was discovered by Rabinowitz in 1992 and was officially named Pholus. Another body that he discovered in 1993 was named Nessus with an orbit of 123.2 years. This one orbits between Saturn and Pluto.

References 
 

1960 births
American astronomers
Jewish American scientists
Michael E. Brown
Discoverers of asteroids
Discoverers of trans-Neptunian objects

Eris (dwarf planet)
Living people
Planetary scientists
Yale University faculty